James Talbot was an Irish Jacobite who served James II in the Irish Army during the War of the Two Kings (1689–91) and was killed at the Battle of Aughrim.

Birth and origins 

James was the eldest son of Sir Henry Talbot and his wife Margaret Talbot. His father owned land around Templeogue, County Dublin.

His mother was the third daughter of Sir William Talbot, 1st Baronet of Carton, County Kildare, and his wife Alison Netterville.

He was the brother of William Talbot also a Jacobite commander.

Due to the influence of his uncle Richard Talbot, 1st Earl of Tyrconnell, James II's viceroy in Ireland, James Talbot was given command of a regiment in the Irish Army with the rank of colonel, although some sources refer to him as a Brigadier.

Marriage and children 
He married Bridget, daughter of Francis de Bermingham, 12th Baron Athenry.

James and Bridget had two daughters:
 Mary, married in 1684 John Burke, 9th Earl of Clanricarde 
 Bridget, married Valentine Browne of Mayo

Death 
Talbot was killed at the Battle of Aughrim, a major defeat for the Jacobites that cost them many experienced and senior officers. His death in battle meant that his estate was not covered under the terms of the Treaty of Limerick that ended the war, and was liable to forfeiture.

Notes and References

Notes

Citations

Sources 

  – (for Talbot of Carton)
  – (for Talbot of Mount Talbot)

Further reading 
 

1691 deaths
17th-century Irish people
Irish Jacobites
Irish military personnel killed in action
Irish soldiers in the army of James II of England
People from Templeogue
James
Year of birth unknown